Discography of Parliament, influential George Clinton-led funk group.

Studio albums

Live albums

Compilation albums

Singles

References

External links

Discographies of American artists
Rhythm and blues discographies
Funk music discographies